Anna Shteynshleyger (born 1977) is a Russian-American photographer.

Early life and education
Born in Moscow,  she moved with her family to Maryland in 1992 at age 15. She began taking photos not long after arriving in the United States, when she received a camera as a gift. She is part of Orthodox Judaism. She holds a BFA degree from the Maryland Institute College of Art, awarded 1999, and an MFA degree from Yale University, awarded in 2001.

Career
In 2009 she was a fellow of the John Simon Guggenheim Foundation.

Her work is included in the collections of the Museum of Fine Arts Houston and the Museum of Contemporary Photography, Chicago.

References

Living people
1977 births
20th-century Russian photographers
21st-century Russian photographers
20th-century Russian women artists
21st-century Russian women artists